The 1990–91 Seton Hall Pirates men's basketball team represented Seton Hall University during the 1990–91 NCAA men's college basketball season. The Pirates were led by ninth year head coach P.J. Carlesimo.

Roster

Schedule and results

|-
!colspan=12 style=| Regular season

|-
!colspan=12 style=| Big East tournament

|-
!colspan=12 style=| NCAA Tournament

Sources

Rankings

Players in the 1991 NBA draft

References

Seton Hall Pirates men's basketball seasons
Seton Hall
Seton Hall
Seton Hall
Seton Hall